Lamas is a surname. Notable people with the surname include:

Carlos Saavedra Lamas (1878–1959), Argentine academic and politician
Fernando Lamas (1915–1982), Argentine actor and director
Joe Lamas (1916–1996), American football player
José Ángel Lamas (1775–1814), Venezuelan composer
Lorenzo Lamas (born 1958), American actor
Julio Lamas (born 1964), Argentine basketball coach
Pedro Lamas Baliero, Uruguayan chess master
Ricardo Lamas (born 1982), American mixed martial artist
Shayne Lamas (born 1985), American actress